Beverly McDonald (born 15 February 1970 in Saint Mary, Jamaica) is a Jamaican sprinter. Her accomplishments include winning the silver medal in the 4 × 100 m relay at the 2000 Olympics and the gold medal in the same event at the 2004 Olympics. She also won the bronze medal at the 2000 Summer Olympics in the 200 m race.

Beverly McDonald is the sister of Michael McDonald.

Personal bests
100 metres - 10.99 (1998)
200 metres - 22.22 (1999)

Achievements

References

External links 
 
 

1970 births
Living people
People from Saint Mary Parish, Jamaica
Jamaican female sprinters
Olympic athletes of Jamaica
Olympic gold medalists for Jamaica
Olympic silver medalists for Jamaica
Olympic bronze medalists for Jamaica
Athletes (track and field) at the 1996 Summer Olympics
Athletes (track and field) at the 2000 Summer Olympics
Athletes (track and field) at the 2004 Summer Olympics
Medalists at the 2004 Summer Olympics
Pan American Games medalists in athletics (track and field)
Athletes (track and field) at the 1991 Pan American Games
World Athletics Championships athletes for Jamaica
World Athletics Championships medalists
Junior college women's track and field athletes in the United States
Medalists at the 2000 Summer Olympics
Olympic gold medalists in athletics (track and field)
Olympic silver medalists in athletics (track and field)
Olympic bronze medalists in athletics (track and field)
Pan American Games gold medalists for Jamaica
Pan American Games bronze medalists for Jamaica
Goodwill Games medalists in athletics
Central American and Caribbean Games gold medalists for Jamaica
Competitors at the 1998 Central American and Caribbean Games
World Athletics Championships winners
Central American and Caribbean Games medalists in athletics
Competitors at the 1998 Goodwill Games
Competitors at the 2001 Goodwill Games
Medalists at the 1991 Pan American Games
Olympic female sprinters